Crocus veluchensis  is a species of flowering plant in the genus Crocus of the family Iridaceae. It is a cormous perennial native to central and southern Albania, ranging to Bulgaria.

References

veluchensis